The Extended Range Guided Munition was a precision guided rocket-assisted 5-inch (127 mm) shell (projectile) development by Raytheon for the U.S. Navy. The program was cancelled in March 2008 after twelve years of development and over 600 million dollars in funding. The developmental round was designated EX 171.

ERGM consisted of three major subsections: propulsion (rocket motor), warhead, and Guidance, Navigation and Control section. ERGM is fired from the 127 mm (5 inch) 62 Caliber Mark 45 gun Mod 4, at which point the would fins deploy and the rocket motor would ignite, lifting the munition to at least 80,000 feet (24 km), after which the canards would deploy and guide the ERGM to the target using GPS guidance. It was to be used on Arleigh Burke-class destroyers (hulls DDG-51 through 112).

A similar system (though for MLRS) developed by SAAB and Boeing reached production in 2019 and is known as the GLSDB.

Synopsis

Despite the long development time, the ERGM never worked as reliably as the older but significantly less expensive laser-guided M712 Copperhead. During development, the ERGM failed several tests in which the tail fins failed to deploy at launch, rocket motors did not ignite, or the electronic components did not survive the stress of being fired from a gun. In February 2008, guidance components, rocket motors, and tail fins all failed in tests; Raytheon claimed they were testing specific functionalities rather than overall functionality and that they were "on the verge" of making the whole system operate reliably, but the Navy had lost confidence after years of issues and were no longer expecting a return on investment. Rising cost was another factor in cancellation. The unit cost of the shell more than quadrupled, from US$45,000 in 1997 to $191,000 by 2006 (the Copperhead unit production price was about $30,000), reducing the projected buy from 8,500 to about 3,150. Program research-and-development costs had increased from $80 million to $400 million between 1997 and 2004, with total program costs increasing from $400 million to $600 million. The Navy formally cancelled the ERGM program on 19 March 2008. BTERM was another U.S. Navy developmental round that included GPS guidance in an artillery shell; it too was terminated in 2008 after over four years of development by ATK.

Specifications 

 Caliber: 127 mm (5 in)
 Length: 1.55 m (5 ft 1 in)
 Weight: 50 kg (110 lb)
 Speed: >3000 km/h (1860 mph)
 Range: 110 km (60 nm)
 Guidance: GPS/INS
 Accuracy: < 20 m CEP independent of range.
 Propulsion: Solid-propellant rocket motor.
 Warhead: 72 DPICM submunitions (EX 1) or unitary high-explosive.

Program timeline 
 1994 - Program started.
 December 2001 - All-up round guided test flight of an ERGM at White Sands Missile Range, NM.
 February 2005 - Successfully test-fired two tactical ERGM rounds.
 April 2005 - U.S. Navy closes original ERGM program and re-opens new competition to meet the requirement.
 March 2008 - Navy ends funding to Raytheon, effectively killing the program.

See also 
 Ballistic Trajectory Extended Range Munition
 Long Range Land Attack Projectile
 Rocket Assisted Projectile
 M982 Excalibur

References

External links 
 
 Raytheon Company: Products & Services: ERGM
 Missile Systems - Precision Guided Projectiles - Raytheon
 

Artillery shells